Aderu (also Romanized as Āderū and Aderū; also known as Ādehrū) is a village in Tang Chenar Rural District, in the Central District of Mehriz County, Yazd Province, Iran. At the 2006 census, its population was 78, in 19 families.

References 

Populated places in Mehriz County